Yibal Airport  is an airport serving the town of Yibal in the Ad Dhahirah Governorate of Oman.

Runway ends are poorly defined, and actual usable length may be longer than listed.

See also
List of airports in Oman
Transport in Oman

References

External links
OurAirports - Yibal Airport
FallingRain - Yibal

Airports in Oman